The 1999 Central and Western District Council election was held on 28 November 1999 to elect all 15 elected members to the 19-member Central and Western District Council, the first election of the Council since the establishment of the Hong Kong Special Administrative Region.

Overall election results
Before election:

Change in composition:

Results by constituency

Belcher

Castle Road

Centre Street

Chung Wan

Kennedy Town & Mount Davis

Kwun Lung

Middle Levels East

Peak

Sai Wan

Sai Ying Pun

Shek Tong Tsui

Sheung Wan

Tung Wah

University

Water Street

References

1999 Hong Kong local elections
Central and Western District Council elections